Wonder Women may refer to:
 Wonder Women (1973 film), an American action film
 Wonder Women (2007 film), a Hong Kong drama film
 Wonder Women! The Untold Story of American Superheroines, a 2012 documentary film
 Wonder Women (2022 film), an English-language Indian film

See also
 Wonder Woman (disambiguation)